Manghopir  or Mangopir is a neighbourhood in the Malir district of Karachi, Sindh, Pakistan, that previously was a part of Gadap Town until 2011.

There are several ethnic groups in Manghopir including Muhajirs, Sindhis, Punjabis, Kashmiris, Seraikis, Pakhtuns, Balochis, Memons, Bohras,  Ismailis, etc. The population of the neighborhood is Muslim. The population of Gadap Town is estimated to be nearly one million.

Manghopir is a rural area of Karachi, named after Sufi Pir Haji Syed Sakhi Sultan. The area has the oldest Sufi shrines in the city, hot sulphur springs that are believed to have curative powers, and many crocodiles - believed locally to be the sacred disciples of Pir Mangho. Balochs often call this place as ‘Mangi’ or Garm-aab / Sard-aab (due to the presence of the hot & cold springs).

Manghopir Lake

The Manghopir Lake is situated near the shrine of Sufi Pir Mangho and there over one hundred Mugger crocodiles in the lake which are fed by the pilgrims.

Sheedis and Festivals

Manghopir is mostly inhabited by one of Pakistan's smallest ethnic communities, the Sheedi, also known as Makrani. Sheedi are said to be the descendants of Afro-Arabs from Zanzibar and maintain their distinct Afro-Arab and Omani identity in the midst of the dominating South Asian cultures.

Presently, these African-Pakistanis live in various parts of Karachi.  Most are found in Lyari, but they are also found in Malir, Moaach Goth, Manghopir, and further interior at Sindh and Balochistan. Due to Lyari's dominant Sheedi people population, it is often called 'Little Africa'. Some Afro-Arab style festivals and dances like Gowaati, Lewa, Dhamaal, beating  Omani style shindo, jabwah, and jasser drums are still popular in Manghopirs Lyari locale. Many forms of folk beliefs and medicines are also still practiced.  A prominent Urdu poet and Lyari citizen, Noon Meem Danish, proudly claims to be the great-great-grandchild of an African from Zanzibar. "Now after centuries of cultural amalgamation, Sheedis proudly call themselves Baloch or Makrani."

See also
Pir Mangho
Manghopir Hills
 Gallery of the shrines and spring in Manghopir

References

External links 
 Karachi Website.

Neighbourhoods of Karachi
Gadap Town